The Mexico City Metro is a rapid transit system serving Greater Mexico City.

List of stations
The following table lists alphabetically all 195 metro stations of the Mexico City Metro system; the line or lines serving each station; the year the station opened; the type of station (underground, elevated or at-grade); and other transportation services the station has connections with, such as the Mexico City Metrobús (a bus rapid transit system), the Xochimilco Light Rail, STE trolleybus networks, and the RTP bus system.

Future stations
As of March 2020, an expansion of Line 12 that will connect Mixcoac to Observatorio is under construction. Two stations, Álvaro Obregón and Valentín Campa, are planned. They are projected to open in 2022.

See also
 List of Mexico City Metro lines

References

External links

 
Mexico City
Metro stations
Mexico City metro stations